Cinemoz is a "Video On Demand" platform to and from the Arab World based in Beirut, Lebanon.

Profile
Founded in June 2011 by Karim Safieddine and Maroun Najm, Cinemoz gives access to viewers to watch entertainment from the Arab World, such as films, series, documentaries and shorts, while interacting with the community through full integration of social media features. It generally provides viewers from the region with free streaming of premium Arabic content. In December 2011, they officially launched their beta version of the website, and in 2019 they launched their official version of the site.

References

External links

Video on demand services